Medius unguisi is a moth of the family Erebidae first described by Michael Fibiger in 2011. It is found in Indonesia (it was described from northern Sumatra).

The wingspan is about 11 mm. The forewings are relatively long and narrow, with a rounded apex. The ground colour is white beige, suffused with light-brown scales in the medial, subterminal, and terminal areas. There are black-brown patches at the base of the costa and the upper quadrangular medial areas. The crosslines are indistinct. The terminal line is indicated by black interveinal dots. The hindwing ground colour is grey with an indistinct discal spot.

References

Micronoctuini
Taxa named by Michael Fibiger
Moths described in 2011